Kenneth Paul Dulieu was chairman and chief executive of Capcon Limited (previously Capcon Holdings plc). He later became non-executive chairman of Southampton Leisure Holdings plc and chairman of Coventry City Football Club. Dulieu is founding trustee of UK Charity Kids in Sport, now part of "Heart of Bucks", and chairman of trustees for the National Youth Harp Orchestra Charitable Trust.

Capcon Holdings plc 
Dulieu founded K & J Dulieu Limited (trading as Capitol Consultants) in 1983, later renamed Capitol Group plc in 1994, on its admission to the London Stock Exchange Official List. He acted as chief executive until the sale of the business to Carlisle Holdings plc in 1998. At point of sale, Capitol Group plc was one of the largest suppliers of security and investigatory services, and counter terrorism in the United Kingdom, with over 3,000 employees.

In 1998, together with others, Dulieu re-purchased the Investigations Division and Audit & Stocktaking business from Carlisle Holdings plc, which was floated on AIM in 2001 as Capcon Holdings plc.

Upon invitation, from 2002 to 2010, he acted as Non-Executive Director and Chair of the Remuneration and Nominations Committees of previously Alternative Investment Market listed Vantis plc, an accountancy and financial services business.

Southampton Football Club 

In 2006, Dulieu was appointed chairman of Southampton Leisure Holdings plc, the publicly listed holdings company of Southampton Football Club. He led a new executive team to effect the financial turnaround and restructure of the club, which was haemorrhaging cash and near the bottom of the English Football League. Within a year, the club was challenging for promotion, losses were reduced from £3.3m to less than £1m and debt was substantially reduced. Dulieu stepped down as chairman in 2007 having completed an extended term to find new investment in the club. He was replaced by Leon Crouch as acting chairman.

Coventry City Football Club
In 2010, Dulieu was appointed chairman of Coventry City Football Club, tasked with devising and implementing a turnaround strategy for the club. Within a year, significant improvements were introduced, including a substantial reduction in losses, the integration of the academy and first team, player contract extensions with flexible terms and an increase in the value of the squad. In December 2011, Dulieu stepped down as chairman, having prepared the club for the implementation of the UEFA Financial Fair Play Regulations.

Other notable business ventures
Capitol Inns - Acquired first public House in 1988 and built into a small chain of six properties and two restaurants, before selling out in 1993 at substantial capital gain to Livingwell Health & Leisure, a Barclays brother’s vehicle.

Eurosave Travel Club Ltd - formed in 1992 to exploit cheap ferry packages to Europe and Scandinavia. Abolition of duty free led to the closure of the business in 2002.

Three Orthopaedic Sports Clinics - Purchased 1992, turned around and sold on in 1995.
Meridien Shipping - formed in 1993 to operate a freight ferry service between Folkestone and Boulogne. Two ships chartered. Turnover first year, £5m+ and profitable. Second year, £7m turnover.

Charitable Work
Dulieu is founding Trustee of UK Charity, Kids in Sport - Julian Budd Kids In Sport Trust Ltd - now part of "Heart of Bucks". In April 2019, the charity transferred to Heart of Bucks, the community foundation for Buckinghamshire; a funding organisation awarding grants and loans to local charities and community groups. 

Dulieu is chairman of trustees for the National Youth Harp Orchestra Charitable Trust.

References
Coventry Telegraph. "Ken Dulieu: Coventry City's darkest hour has passed", 10 November 2011
Coventry Telegraph. "Where are they now? Coventry City's 'best ever' board", 16 May 2014 
Evening Standard. "Saints are the goal for secretive hedge fund", 24 October 20017 

Year of birth missing (living people)
Living people
English businesspeople
Coventry City F.C. directors and chairmen
Southampton F.C. directors and chairmen
Place of birth missing (living people)